The Albania women's national under-20 basketball team is a national basketball team of Albania, administered by the Albanian Basketball Federation.
It represents the country in women's international under-20 basketball competitions.

The team finished 14th at the 2022 FIBA U20 Women's European Championship Division B.

See also
Albania women's national under-18 basketball team
Albania women's national under-16 basketball team
Albania men's national under-20 basketball team

References

External links
Archived records of Albania team participations

Basketball in Albania
Women's national under-20 basketball teams